The Croatia men's national volleyball team represents Croatia in international volleyball competitions and friendly matches. It is governed by the Croatian Volleyball Federation.

Results
Prior to 1992 Croatia men's national volleyball team competed as a part of Yugoslavia men's national volleyball team.

Competitions Croatia men's national volleyball team has never qualified for or competed at:
 the Olympic Games
 the World Cup
 the World Grand Champions Cup
 the World League
 the Junior World Championship
 the Youth Olympic Games

World Championship

European Championship

European League

Mediterranean Games

Team

Current squad

Croatia squad for 2022 Mediterranean Games

 Bernard Bakonji
 Petar Đirlić
 Tino Hanžić
 Ivan Mihalj
 Tomislav Mitrašinović
 Kruno Nikačević
 Stipe Perić
 Hrvoje Pervan
 Marko Sedlaček
 Filip Šestan
 Petar Višić
 Ivan Zeljković

Team coached by Cédric Énard

Notable players
 Tomislav Čošković
 best server of the 2006 European League
 Inoslav Krnić
 best setter of the 2006 European League
 Igor Omrčen
 top scorer of the 2004 European League
 top scorer of the 2006 European League
 Tsimafei Zhukouski
 best server of the 2013 European League
 Ivan Raič
 top scorer and best spiker of the 2013 European League
 Danijel Galić
 best receiver of the 2013 European League

Former squads
 silver medal at the 2006 European League: Tsimafei Zhukouski, Danijel Galić, Darko Nojić, Igor Omrčen, Šime Vulin, Jura Boriskijević (L), Dragan Puljić, Mario Zelić, Toni Kovačević, Tomislav Čošković, Inoslav Krnić, Roko Sikirić
 coach: Rade Malević
 silver medal at the 2013 European League: Tsimafei Zhukouski (C), Matija Sabljak, Darko Nojić, Nikola Ščerbakov, Ivan Raič, Sven Šarčević (L), Marko Sedlaček, Ivan Ćosić, Mladen Jurčević, Fran Peterlin, Goran Išek, Ivan Tropan
 coach: Igor Šimunčić

Player statistics

Most appearances

Record against other teams
As of 13 Oct 2015

See also
Croatia women's national volleyball team

External links
Official website
FIVB profile

National men's volleyball teams
Croatia national volleyball team
Men's volleyball in Croatia
Men's sport in Croatia